A  Jewish Buddhist is a person with a Jewish background who practices forms of Dhyanam Buddhist meditation, chanting or spirituality. When the individual practices a particular religion, it may be both Judaism and Buddhism.  However, in many cases their ethnic designation is Jewish while the individual's main religious practice is Buddhism. Rodger Kamenetz introduced the term JewBu or JUBU in his 1994 book The Jew in the Lotus.

Origins

At the 1893 Parliament of the World's Religions, a Jewish man named Charles Strauss declared himself a Buddhist following talks by Buddhist delegates Soyen Shaku and Anagarika Dharmapala.

After Zen's rise in popularity with the Beat Generation, a new wave of Jews became involved with Buddhism in the late 1960s. Prominent teachers included Joseph Goldstein, Jack Kornfield,  and Sharon Salzberg who founded the Insight Meditation Society, Sylvia Boorstein who teaches at Spirit Rock Meditation Center,  all of whom learned vipassana meditation primarily through Thai teachers.  Another generation of Jews as Buddhist teachers emerged in the early 2000s, including author Taro Gold, expounding Japanese traditions such as Nichiren Buddhism.

Notable people

 Alfred Bloom
 Bhikkhu Bodhi
 Sylvia Boorstein
 Tara Brach
 Thubten Chodron
 Leonard Cohen
 Surya Das
 Robert Downey Jr.
 Mark Epstein
 Anthony Ervin
 Zoketsu Norman Fischer
 Allen Ginsberg
 Philip Glass
 Tetsugen Bernard Glassman
 Craig Taro Gold
 Natalie Goldberg
 Yuval Noah Harari
 Joseph Goldstein
 Julius Goldwater
 Daniel Goleman
 Dan Harris
 Goldie Hawn 
 Jon Kabat-Zinn
 Ayya Khema
 Jack Kornfield
 Jay Michaelson
 Ethan Nichtern
 Mandy Patinkin
 Jeremy Piven
 Linda Pritzker
 Nick Ribush
 Jonathan F.P. Rose
 Larry Rosenberg
 Sharon Salzberg
 Morrie Schwartz
 Nyanaponika Thera
 Helen Tworkov
 Adam Yauch
 Shinzen Young

See also
 Jews and Buddhism
 List of converts to Buddhism

References

Further reading
 
 
 
 
 
 
Musch, Sebastian. Jewish Encounters with Buddhism in German Culture. Between Moses and Buddha(1890-1940). Palgrave 2019. .

External links
 The “Oy Vey” School of Buddhism
 AFC News Source – Jews by birth who practice Buddhism
 Story of a Jewish Buddhist
 You don't look Buddhist
 A frank encounter between religious Jews and Tibetan Buddhists 
 Excerpt from Letters to a Buddhist Jew by Akiva Tatz

 
Buddhist
Religious syncretism